Lindsay is a city in Garvin County, Oklahoma, United States. The population was 2,840 at the 2010 census. It once promoted itself as "The Broomcorn Capital of the World" but no longer uses that slogan, as broomcorn is no longer raised in the area.

History
Lindsay was founded in January 1902, when the Kiowa, Chickasha and Fort Smith Railway (an affiliate of the Atchison, Topeka and Santa Fe) and the Chicago, Rock Island and Pacific railroad companies were linking their lines halfway between Chickasha and Pauls Valley, a project completed in 1903.  The AT&SF trains from Pauls Valley turned around at Lindsay, and the Rock Island trains from Chickasha did the same.    

Lindsay was named after Lewis Lindsay, a local area farmer who donated  of land for the townsite.  At the time of its founding, Lindsay was located in Pickens County, Chickasaw Nation.

Geography
Lindsay is located in northwestern Garvin County at  (34.837280, -97.607537). The town's northern border follows the McClain County line.

Lindsay is in the Washita River valley. Oklahoma State Highway 19 passes through the center of town as Cherokee Street, leading east (downriver)  to Maysville and northwest (generally upstream)  to Chickasha. Oklahoma State Highway 76 leads north from Lindsay  to Blanchard and south  Healdton.

Climate

Demographics

As of the census of 2000, there were 2,889 people, 1,244 households, and 794 families residing in the city. The population density was 1,231.9 people per square mile (474.7/km2). There were 1,446 housing units at an average density of 616.6 per square mile (237.6/km2). The racial makeup of the city was 90.86% White, 0.14% African American, 4.92% Native American, 0.10% Asian, 0.03% Pacific Islander, 0.76% from other races, and 3.18% from two or more races. Hispanic or Latino of any race were 1.25% of the population.

There were 1,244 households, out of which 27.3% had children under the age of 18 living with them, 52.1% were married couples living together, 9.4% had a female householder with no husband present, and 36.1% were non-families. 34.5% of all households were made up of individuals, and 21.7% had someone living alone who was 65 years of age or older. The average household size was 2.28 and the average family size was 2.91.

In the city, the population was spread out, with 23.3% under the age of 18, 8.5% from 18 to 24, 24.1% from 25 to 44, 19.1% from 45 to 64, and 25.0% who were 65 years of age or older. The median age was 40 years. For every 100 females, there were 81.8 males. For every 100 females age 18 and over, there were 78.1 males.

The median income for a household in the city was $26,667, and the median income for a family was $35,208. Males had a median income of $26,831 versus $18,207 for females. The per capita income for the city was $14,320. About 9.9% of families and 15.6% of the population were below the poverty line, including 19.4% of those under age 18 and 12.5% of those age 65 or over.

Economy
In Lindsay, the oilfield industry is a major source of revenue and jobs.

Education
Lindsay Public Schools provide schooling from kindergarten through high school.

Transportation
Lindsay is at the intersection of Oklahoma State Highway 76 and Oklahoma State Highway 19.  The intersection of SH-59B with SH-19 is just east of town, which leads to Oklahoma State Highway 59.

The city is served by Lindsay Municipal Airport northeast of town.

Parks and Attractions
The City of Lindsay has three public parks:  Charlie Jones Park (on North West 4th Street), George Brown Park (on Highway 76 North, along with the Lindsay Municipal Golf Course), and Shady Grove Park (on 498 W Apache St, along with a swimming pool).

The Murray-Lindsay Mansion & Pikes Peak School features an 1880 home and furnishings, built by Irish immigrant Frank Murray and his wife, Alzira McCaughey, a Choctaw Indian. It contains 15 rooms, two baths, and four fireplaces. Also on-site is a 1908 Pikes Peak two-room school house, across the road from the Mansion.  The Mansion is on the National Register of Historic Places listings in Garvin County, Oklahoma as "Erin Springs Mansion."

References

External links
City of Lindsay official website

Cities in Oklahoma
Cities in Garvin County, Oklahoma
Populated places established in 1902
1902 establishments in Indian Territory